Grajena is a settlement located on the Grajena Creek in the Municipality of Ptuj in northeastern Slovenia. The area is part of the traditional region of Styria. It is now included with the rest of the municipality in the Drava Statistical Region.

Parts of the Roman water system supplying nearby Poetovio has been identified near the settlement.

References

External links

Grajena at Geopedia

Populated places in the City Municipality of Ptuj